SPQR is , Latin for the government of the ancient Roman Republic.

SPQR may also refer to:

Arts and entertainment
 SPQR series, a collection of detective stories set in the time of the Roman Republic
 SPQR: The Empire's Darkest Hour, a computer adventure game set in Ancient Rome
 SPQR (board game), a board wargame
 Steve Perrin's Quest Rules, a generic role-playing game system
 SPQR: A History of Ancient Rome, a 2015 book by Mary Beard
 S.P.Q.R.: 2,000 and a Half Years Ago (1994), an Italian comedy film
 S.P.Q.R., a track on the album Deceit by experimental rock band This Heat
 S. P. Q. R., a record label distributed by London Records

Science and technology
 SPQR tree, a data structure for graph connectivity and planar embeddings
 Small Payload Quick Return, a NASA Ames program for "de-orbiting" small payloads

Other uses
 Quiruvilca Airport (ICAO code), a defunct airport in Peru
 Sebastian Patrick Quintus Rahtz (1955–2016), British digital humanities information professional
 SPQR, in the List of Michelin starred restaurants in San Francisco Bay Area